The 2nd District of the Iowa House of Representatives in the state of Iowa.

Current elected officials
Megan Jones is the representative currently representing the district.

Past representatives
The district has previously been represented by:
 A. Gordon Stokes, 1971–1973
 Lyle R. Stephens, 1973–1975
 James W. Spradling, 1975–1977
 Lyle R. Stephens, 1977–1979
 Douglas J. Ritsema, 1979–1983
 Al Sturgeon, 1983–1987
 Michael R. Peters, 1987–1991
 Patrick Gill, 1991–1995
 Steve Warnstadt, 1995–2003
 Roger Wendt, 2003–2011
 Chris Hall, 2011–2013
 Megan Jones, 2013–present

References

002